Hinduism is a minority religion in Khyber Pakhtunkhwa followed by 0.02% of the population of the province as per 2017 Census. 

Though having a small population and presence, the history of Khyber Pakhtunkhwa had a very significant element of Hindu culture. 

In the final census conducted prior to partition in 1941, Hindus constituted approximately 5.9 percent of the population in North-West Frontier Province, which later amalgamated with the Federally Administered Tribal Areas to become Khyber Pakhtunkhwa. With violence and religious cleansing accompanying the partition of India in 1947, the vast majority departed the region en masse, primarily migrating eastward to states that ultimately fell on the eastern side of the Radcliffe Line including Delhi, East Punjab, Haryana, and Rajasthan.

History

Ancient era 
The Gandharan civilization features prominently in the Hindu epic poem, the Mahabharatha, The Vedic texts refer to the area as the province of Pushkalavati. The area was once known to be a great center of learning.

Medieval era 

In the first millennium CE, the Khyber Pakhtunkhwa region was ruled by Hindu-Buddhist Turk Shahi and Hindu Shahi dynasties. During the rule of the Shahis, the Khyber Pakhtunkhwa region was a center of trade. Textiles, gems, and perfumes, as well as other goods had been exported West and into Central Asia. 

The Shahis were known for their many Hindu temples. These temples were mostly looted and destroyed by later invaders. The ruins of these temples can be found at Nandana, Malot, Siv Ganga, Katas, or Amb, as well as across the west bank of the Indus River at the foothills of the Sulaiman and Hindu Kush mountain ranges, such as at Kafir Kot, Bilot Sharif, or Gumbat. At the height of Shahi rule under King Jayapala, the kingdom had extended to Kabul and Bajaur to the northwest, Multan to the south, and the plains of Punjab to the east. Jayapala, threatened from the consolidation of power by the Ghaznavid dynasty, invaded their capital city of Ghazni. This had initiated the Muslim Ghaznavid and Hindu Shahi struggles. 

Over time, Mahmud of Ghazni had pushed further into the subcontinent, as far as east as modern day Agra. During his campaigns, many Hindu temples and Buddhist monasteries had been looted and destroyed, as well as many people being forcibly converted into Islam. Local Pashtun and Dardic tribes converted to Islam, while retaining some of the pre-Islamic Hindu-Buddhist and Animist local traditions such as Pashtunwali and the Attan.

Colonial era 
During the colonial era, census reports detailed that much of the indigenous Hindu population in the North-West Frontier Province chiefly belonged to castes and tribes involved in trade such as the Arora, Bhatia, Bhatiara, Khatri, or Gurjar; many of whom form portions of contemporary ethnolinguistic groups such as the Hindkowans, Hazarewals, Kohistanis, or Saraikis. 

In a similar manner to the Baloch Hindus to the south, Hindus belonging to the various castes and tribes who were indigenous to the frontier regions had considerable Islamic influence, owing to their status as a religious minority in the region for centuries, and thus formed religious syncretism that incorporated aspects from both faiths into their cultures and traditions. Furthermore, caste differentiation amongst the Hindus of the region was often greatly diminished, in contrast with the Hindus of regions further to the east in the Gangetic plain such as eastern Punjab or the United Provinces.

Traditionally, Hindu members of the castes and tribes who were indigenous to the frontier regions of the Indian subcontinent (between the Indus River, Sulaiman range, and the Hindu Kush mountains) had longstanding trading relationships with Afghanistan along with other regions of western and central Asia, which they linked with the Indo-Gangetic Plain of India. Conversely, most of the Hindu migrants in the North-West Frontier Province were involved with the military, primarily concentrated in town cantonments. 

Immediately prior to 1947 Partition of India, the British held a referendum in the NWFP to allow voters to choose between joining India or Pakistan and 99.02% votes were cast in favor of Pakistan. After the independence of Pakistan in 1947, most of the Hindus left for India.

Demographics 

During the colonial era (British India), prior to the partition in 1947, decadal censuses enumerated religion in North-West Frontier Province, and not in the Federally Administered Tribal Areas. Both administrative divisions later amalgamated to become Khyber Pakhtunkhwa.

1921 census 
According to the 1921 census, the Hindu population in North-West Frontier Province (part of the region that composes contemporary Khyber Pakhtunkhwa) was approximately 149,881, or 6.7 percent of the total population.

Districts 
At the district level in North-West Frontier Province, as per the 1921 census, the largest Hindu concentrations existed in Dera Ismail Khan District (Hindus formed 15.08 percent of the total population and numbered 39,311 persons), Bannu District (9.53 percent or 23,509 persons), and Kohat District (6.01 percent or 12,879 persons).

Tehsils 
At the tehsil level in North-West Frontier Province, as per the 1921 census, the largest Hindu concentrations existed in Tank Tehsil (Hindus formed 17.14 percent of the total population and numbered 10,224 persons) Dera Ismail Khan Tehsil (15.82 percent or 24,685 persons), Bannu Tehsil (11.32 percent or 16,130 persons), Kulachi Tehsil (9.76 percent or 4,402 persons), and Peshawar Tehsil (9.65 percent or 25,414 persons).

Cities 
According to the 1921 census, the Hindu population in urban portions of North-West Frontier Province was approximately 134,382, or 24.3 percent of the total urban population. Cities/urban areas in North-West Frontier Province with the largest Hindu concentrations included Bannu (Hindus formed 59.4 percent of the total population and numbered 13,222 persons), Abbottabad (53.94 percent or 7,346 persons), Jamrud (50.82 percent or 3,114 persons), Haripur (44.76 percent or 2,636 persons), and Dera Ismail Khan (43.41 percent or 17,077 persons).

1941 census 
According to the 1941 census, the Hindu population in North-West Frontier Province (part of the region that composes contemporary Khyber Pakhtunkhwa) was approximately 180,321, or 5.9 percent of the total population.

Districts 
At the district level in North-West Frontier Province, as per the 1941 census, the largest Hindu concentrations existed in Dera Ismail Khan District (Hindus formed 13.14 percent of the total population and numbered 39,167 persons), Bannu District (10.63 percent or 31,471 persons), and Kohat District (6.06 percent or 17,527 persons).

Tehsils 
At the tehsil level in North-West Frontier Province, as per the 1941 census, the largest Hindu concentrations existed in Dera Ismail Khan Tehsil (Hindus formed 16.03 percent of the total population and numbered 30,065 persons), Bannu Tehsil (13.07 percent or 24,517 persons), Hangu Tehsil (9.52 percent or 5,909 persons), Tank Tehsil (9.48 percent or 5,279 persons), and Peshawar Tehsil (8.62 percent or 33,551 persons).

Cities 
According to the 1941 census, the Hindu population in urban portions of North-West Frontier Province was approximately 134,382, or 24.3 percent of the total urban population. Cities/urban areas in North-West Frontier Province with the largest Hindu concentrations included Bannu (Hindus formed 57.59 percent of the total population and numbered 22,175 persons), Dera Ismail Khan (44.47 percent or 22,815 persons), Risalpur (43.71 percent or 3,937 persons), Abbottabad (43.34 percent or 11,886 persons), and Lakki (36.58 percent or 3,710 persons).

1998 census 
According to the 1998 Census, there are 5,090 Hindus (including the Scheduled Castes) constituting 0.029% of the population of Khyber Pakhtunkhwa.

2017 census 
In the 2017 Census, there were 5,392 Hindus constitutes 0.015% of the population. However, Pakistan Hindu Council estimates that there are 21,033 Hindus in Khyber Pakhtunkhwa.

Community life
In Peshawar, capital of Khyber Pakhtunkhwa, Hindus enjoy religious freedom and live peacefully alongside the Muslims. The city of Peshawar today is home to four Hindu tribes– the Balmiks, the Rajputs, the Heer Ratan Raths and the Bhai Joga Singh Gurdwara community. Since partition, the four tribes have lived in harmony with all religious communities including Muslims. However, there is the lack of upkeep of the dilapidated Hindu temples in the city. The local government always fails to assign caretakers and priests at temples. But in other parts of Khyber Pakhtunkhwa like Buner, Swat and Aurakzai Agencies, Hindu and Sikh families, have been targeted by Taliban for failing to pay Jizya (religious tax) and due to this more than 150 Sikhs and Hindu families in Pakistan's have moved to Hasan Abdal and Rawalpindi in Punjab in 2009.

The Kalasha people practice an ancient form of Hinduism mixed with animism. They are considered as a separate ethnic religion people by the government of Pakistan. They reside in the Chitral District of Khyber-Pakhtunkhwa province.

Mansehra Shiv Temple is one of the oldest Hindu temple in Pakistan that is still in existence. It is at least 2000 to 3000 years old. Panj Tirath is another historic hindu temple in Pakistan. In 2020 Karak temple attack, historic Hindu temple and Samadhi in Karak district was demolished and burnt by a mob of 1,500 local Muslims led by a local Islamic cleric and the supporters of Jamiat Ulema-e-Islam party.

Temples

 Kalibari Mandir, Peshawar

See also

Hinduism in Sindh province
Hinduism in Balochistan
Hinduism in Punjab Province
Bannu District

Notes

References

External links 
 

 
Religion in Khyber Pakhtunkhwa